The 2015–16 RCD Espanyol season was the club's 114th season in its history and its 81st in the La Liga, the top-flight Spanish football.

Current squad

Out on loan

Competitions

Overall

Overview

La Liga

League table

Results summary

Result round by round

Matches

See also
2015–16 La Liga

2015–16 Copa del Rey

References

External links
Club's official website

2015-16
Spanish football clubs 2015–16 season
Espanyol